Arapaho Pass, elevation , is a mountain pass that crosses the Continental Divide in the Rabbit Ears Range of the Rocky Mountains of northern Colorado in the United States.

References

Landforms of Grand County, Colorado
Landforms of Jackson County, Colorado
Mountain passes of Colorado
Great Divide of North America